Ajay Singh Deol (born 19 October 1956), better known by his stage name Sunny Deol, is an Indian actor, film director, producer, politician and incumbent Member of Parliament from Gurdaspur (Lok Sabha constituency) of Punjab, India. As an actor, he has worked in more than 100 Hindi films and earned the image of an angry action hero. He went on to star in numerous successful films in the 1980s and 1990s and is considered as one of the top stars of that time. He starred in several blockbuster movies such as Ghayal, Darr, Damini, Jeet, Ghatak, [[Ziddi (1997 film)|Ziddi]], Border and Gadar: Ek Prem Katha. Deol has won two National Film Award for Best Actor and two Filmfare Awards.

Deol made his debut opposite fellow debutante Amrita Singh in Betaab (1983), for which  he received a Filmfare Best Actor Award nomination. With his portrayal of an amateur boxer wrongly accused of his brother's murder in Rajkumar Santoshi's Ghayal in 1990, Deol gained wide recognition and praise and won the Filmfare Award for Best Actor and the National Film Award – Special Jury Award / Special Mention (Feature Film). His portrayal of a lawyer in the film Damini – Lightning (1993) won him the National Film Award for Best Supporting Actor and the Filmfare Award for Best Supporting Actor. Anil Sharma's Gadar: Ek Prem Katha (2001), in which Deol portrayed a lorry driver who falls in love with a Pakistani Muslim girl, was the highest-grossing Bollywood film ever at the time of its release, and garnered him a Filmfare Best Actor Award nomination.

 Early life 
Sunny Deol was born on 19 October 1956, in the village of Sahnewal in Punjab, India in a Punjabi Jat family, to Bollywood actor Dharmendra and Parkash Kaur.

He has a younger brother Bobby Deol and two sisters Vijayta and Ajeeta who are settled in California. Hema Malini is his step-mother. Actress Esha Deol and Ahana Deol are his half-sisters. His cousin Abhay Deol is also an actor.

 Personal life 
Sunny Deol is married to Pooja Deol (aka Lynda Deol) and the couple has two sons, Karan and Rajveer. Karan was an assistant director on Yamla Pagla Deewana 2 and has rapped in a song sung by Diljit Dosanjh in the film. Karan Deol has made his Bollywood debut with the Hindi-language feature film Pal Pal Dil Ke Paas. 

 Acting career 

Deol made his debut in the 1983 romantic film Betaab in which role he was praised and he was nominated for best actor at Filmfare Awards. Deol has appeared in Rahul Rawail's Arjun (1985), in which he played the titular role of an unemployed youngster. The film went on to become a major hit and established Sunny Deol's status as an action hero. In 1986 he appeared alongside his father in Sultanat. In the final years of the decade he appeared in several hits including Dacait (1987), Yateem (1988) and Paap Ki Duniya (1988). In 1989, he had back to back hits with Rajiv Rai's Tridev and Pankaj Parashar's ChaalBaaz.  He even won his first Filmfare Award for Best Actor in Rajkumar Santoshi's 1990 film Ghayal. He paired with Aditya Pancholi in Vishnu-Devaa (1991). From 1992 to 1997, he gave back to back hits with films like Lootere, Darr, Jeet, Ghatak, Border and Ziddi. In 1999 he made his directorial debut with Dillagi starring himself, his brother and Urmila Matondkar.

His first hit in the millennium was Anil Sharma's 2001 film Gadar. In 2003 he teamed up with director Anil Sharma yet again for The Hero: Love Story of a Spy, which also starred Preity Zinta and Priyanka Chopra. The film became the third highest-grossing Bollywood film of that year. Deol appeared alongside his father Dharmendra and brother Bobby Deol together for the first time in Apne (2007). In 2008, he appeared with his brother again in the ensemble film Heroes.

Deol’s first release of 2010 was Neeraj Pathak's crime thriller Right Yaaa Wrong which had him playing a police inspector. Yamla Pagla Deewana which also featured him alongside his father and brother was Deol's only release in 2011 and was one of the biggest successes of the year. In 2011, he started working in Radhika Rao and Vinay Sapru I Love NY opposite Kangana Ranaut and in Chandraprakash Dwivedi's Mohalla Assi opposite Sakshi Tanwar, but due to some reason both films were delayed and released several years later.
For the first time in his career, Deol lent his voice (for Bheem) in the Animated film Mahabharata; produced by Jayantilal Gada of PEN India Pvt Ltd. It earned ₹16.9 millions whereas Yamla Pagla Deewana earned ₹887.25 millions. Yamla Pagla Deewana 2, a sequel to his 2011 hit was released in 2013 but the film was a critical and box office failure. In the end of 2013 Deol teamed up with Anil Sharma yet again for Singh Saab The Great which was loved massively and created a big pandemonium in the cinema hall as well as on Facebook.

In 2016, Ghayal Once Again was released which is a sequel to his 1990 film Ghayal and is the second film directed by him. In 2017 he and his brother appeared in Shreyas Talpade's comedy film Poster Boys, which became a semi hit at the box office. In 2018, Deol appeared in Yamla Pagla Deewana: Phir Se, the third film in the franchise. Also that year, two of his long delayed films Bhaiyyaji Superhitt (where he plays a double role for the first time), and Mohalla Assi were released. In 2019, he directed his third film Pal Pal Dil Ke Paas, marking the debut of his son Karan Deol. He will be seen in Apne 2'' which will be releasing on Diwali 2021 it will also star Dharmendra, Bobby Deol and Karan Deol.

Political career 

Deol joined the Bharatiya Janata Party (BJP) on 23 April 2019. He won the 2019 Lok Sabha Elections from Gurdaspur constituency against his rival Sunil Jakhar of Indian national Congress with a margin of 82,459 votes.

Filmography

Awards and nominations

References

External links 

 

1956 births
Living people
Indian male voice actors
Indian male film actors
Film producers from Mumbai
Film directors from Mumbai
Hindi-language film directors
Filmfare Awards winners
Screen Awards winners
Male actors in Hindi cinema
Punjabi people
Mithibai College alumni
Indian Sikhs
Best Supporting Actor National Film Award winners

Male actors from Mumbai
Male actors from Punjab, India
People from Ludhiana district
20th-century Indian male actors
21st-century Indian male actors
Film directors from Punjab, India
Film producers from Punjab, India
Special Jury Award (feature film) National Film Award winners
India MPs 2019–present
Lok Sabha members from Punjab, India
Bharatiya Janata Party politicians from Punjab
Indian actor-politicians